Cape Zumberge is a steep rock cape on the west side of the Ronne Ice Shelf, marking the southwest end of the Orville Coast of Palmer Land on the continent of Antarctica. The name "Zumberge Nunatak" was given by the US-IGY party from Ellsworth Station, 1957–58, to a rock feature reported to lie 30 miles (48 km) north of the westernmost traverse station occupied by the party. The cape described, though somewhat farther north, is apparently the only rock feature lying in that direction. It is named for James Zumberge, American glaciologist who has made studies of the Ross Ice Shelf.

References

Headlands of Palmer Land